Oklahoma CyberKnife is a cancer treatment center based in Oklahoma. The center treats malignant and benign tumors in the lungs, spine, brain, liver, pancreas, eye, prostate and kidney using CyberKnife technology. Oklahoma CyberKnife has treated patients from around Oklahoma as well as patients from bordering states.

Oklahoma CyberKnife opened in 2008 as part of Hillcrest Medical Center. 
In 2009, the center performed the highest number of lung-cancer treatments of any CyberKnife center internationally. Lung tumors continue to make up a majority of cases treated at Oklahoma CyberKnife.

In 2012, Oklahoma CyberKnife began treating prostate patients with Medicare coverage provided they were participants in a clinical trial.

Dr. Diane Heaton, Oklahoma CyberKnife's medical director, is an expert in the treatment of trigeminal neuralgia, a neurological disorder. She appeared at the 2012 annual meeting of the CyberKnife Society to present her clinical findings from a study examining pain relief in 19 trigeminal neuralgia patients following CyberKnife treatment.

References

Cancer organizations based in the United States
Medical and health organizations based in Oklahoma